Barbar Qaleh (also Romanized as Barbar Qal‘eh; also known as Qal‘eh-ye Barbak and Qal‘eh-ye Barbar) is a village in Atrak Rural District, Maneh District, Maneh and Samalqan County, North Khorasan Province, Iran. At the 2006 census, its population was 380, in 85 families.

References 

Populated places in Maneh and Samalqan County